Bass for Your Face is the second studio album by American hip hop producer and recording artist DJ Muggs. The album was released by Ultra Records on January 15, 2013 in the United States.

Background 
Given Muggs’ deep roots in the rap scene, the January release of Bass for Your Face on dance super-label Ultra Records was both a surprise and marked change in direction. True to its name, the album does offer loads of low-end, but more than anything else, it’s an exercise in sonic exploration for Muggs. The album meshes sounds from dubstep, glitch, trap and hip-hop into a coherent, innovative whole.

Promotion 
Muggs recorded material for the album with American and British artists and also with Finnish singer Romy Harmony. In January 2012, Muggs dropped a video for "Snap Ya Neck Back" featuring UK rapper Dizzee Rascal, Los Angeles-based MC Bambu and starring his Cypress Hill bandmate B-Real. The first song released from the album was "Wicked", which features Public Enemy's hip hop veteran Chuck D and rap rock (həd) p.e.'s vocalist Jahred. Muggs enlisted the help of directors Andrew Kline and Eric Thompson of PushOneStop to create the futuristic landscape for the "Soundclash Business" video, released on February 28, 2013. Muggs brings his video for "Safe from Harm" featuring UK songstress Belle Humble  on August 20, 2013. There are two versions of the song in the album.

Track listing 

† On some versions of the CD the fourth track is renamed "Shotta (Itchy Robot Remix)"

Personnel 
Bambu – rap vocals
Belle Humble – vocals
Carlton Douglas Ridenhour – rap vocals
Dylan Kwabana Mills – rap vocals
Fredrick Tipton – rap vocals
Lawrence Muggerud – primary artist, producer, vocals
Patrick Knight – rap vocals
Paulo Sergio Gomes – vocals
Rahzel M. Brown – vocals
Rakeem Calief Myer – rap vocals
Romy Harmony – vocals

References 

2013 albums
DJ Muggs albums
Ultra Records albums
Albums produced by DJ Muggs